Shoshanat HaAmakim (lit. Lily of the Valleys) is a community settlement in central Israel. Located to the north of Netanya, it falls under the jurisdiction of Hefer Valley Regional Council.

History
The village was established in 1951 and was built by the Rassco company. Its name is taken from the Song of Songs 2:1;
I am a rose of Sharon, a lily of the valleys. (From modern Hebrew, this can also be translated as "lily of Sharon, a rose of the valleys".)

The neighbouring moshav Havatzelet HaSharon ("rose/lily of Sharon") is named after the first part of this verse.

References

Community settlements
Populated places established in 1951
Populated places in Central District (Israel)
1951 establishments in Israel